Flea circuses in popular culture are represented in numerous cartoons, films, television shows, music, and novels. A flea circus is a sideshow in a fairground or circus that may involve real or artificial fleas as performers.

Cartoons 

 The Tex Avery cartoon The Flea Circus (MGM, 1954) features a French flea circus that disbands when the fleas see a dog and attack it; one flea, François (voiced by Bill Thompson, best known as the voice of Droopy), who played a sad flea clown, marries the star flea, Fifi, and they have enough offspring together to bring the flea circus back to life.
 Dixieland Droopy (1954), this Tex Avery-directed animated short in the Droopy series, features Droopy, as John Irving Pettybone, finding a "flea band" and being chased by a flea circus owner who wants the band for his circus. John Pettybone ultimately becomes the "dog of mystery," who supposedly "plays Dixieland without a band."
 Curtain Razor is a vintage Warner Bros. cartoon that has Porky Pig as a theatrical agent auditioning acts, including a shaggy dog, who turns out to be the transport of a flea circus, which proceeds to set itself up, perform, and return to the dog, on command.
 The Batfink episode "Jumping Jewelry" (1967) features Professor Hopper, an owner of a flea circus, using his trained fleas to steal jewelry.
 A Sesame Street animation spotlighting the letter "F" features a ringmaster presiding over a flea circus whose performers all begin with "F"; one ends up injuring his foot and another ends up destroying the whole circus trying to shoot himself from a cannon. Ringmaster: "Anybody wanna buy a used F?"
 A Season 26 episode of Sesame Street featured a flea circus at the Furry Arms Hotel, when the inhabitants have to the take care of the fleas; they accidentally let them loose, causing everyone in the hotel to get itched by the fleas.
 The Jetsons season 2 episode "Fugitive Fleas" (1985), a rock band of fleas take refuge on Astro to escape the tyrannical Solarini's flea circus.
 In the 1986 Cartoon, Foofurs season 2 episode, "What Price Fleadom", Fleadini's Flea Circus was stolen by the Rat Brothers to infest Hazel. 
 Flea Circus (mid-1990s) is an autobiographical comic strip by Vic Pratt.
 Mona the Vampire features an episode in season one titled "Flea Circus of Horrors," which was broadcast in 2000.
 Grimmy's Flea Circus (2001) is a book in the Mother Goose and Grimm comic strip series.
 Haunted Mansion issue 4 (August 2006) "Night of the Ghost Fleas" features Fifi, the ghost dog, being plagued by ghost fleas who create a flea circus that ends up on his head.
 Ruby Gloom, a Canadian cartoon based in an apparel franchise that ran from 2006 and 2008 had two episodes featuring a flea circus show. The first one, Venus De Gloomsville (2007), where Skullboy tried to train fleas for his own personal circus, but the constant yells of the Venus Flytrap from the house made his training a mess. The second time happened, in the episode, Pet Poepulation (from the same year), Skullboy takes his circus to a pet talent contest, where they participate. Although they lose the prize, because the fleas were not even seen in the crowd due their size.
 The Muppet Show: The Treasure of Peg-Leg Wilson issue 3 (2009) features fleas who put on the act, Julius Prunes Amazing Flea Circus, on Animal's drums.
 Flea Circus (2010) is an animation by Graeme Meredith.
 The Adventures of Jimmy Neutron: Boy Genius episode "Jimmy Goes to College", features Hugh Neutron owning a flea circus.
 The Hey Duggee episode "The Circus Badge", focuses on a flea circus.
 The SpongeBob SquarePants episode "Under the Small Top", involves a flea circus ravaging Squidward's house.

Films 

 Thundering Fleas (1926) An Our Gang film featuring Oliver Hardy and a cameo appearance by comedian Charley Chase.
 The Chimp (1932), this Laurel and Hardy short film features a flea circus given as a pay-off, which escapes into the bed, causing everyone to itch
 It's in the Bag! (1945), Fred Allen is a flea circus ringmaster
 Limelight (1952), Charlie Chaplin performing a flea circus
 Mr. Arkadin (1955), Mischa Auer plays a flea circus owner (with real fleas) in this Orson Welles film.
 Jurassic Park (1993) creator John Hammond explains how he used to exhibit a flealess mechanical flea circus when he was first starting out in entertainment.
 The City of Lost Children (1995) features a former circus/freak show owner, Marcello, who uses performing fleas carrying poison to assassinate people.
 A Bug's Life (1998), the Disney/Pixar animated film, centers on a troupe of flea circus performers, including their owner, P.T. Flea, a parody of the real-life circus entrepreneur P.T. Barnum
 The Death of the Flea Circus Director by Thomas Koerfer, a dark tale of a performer who switches from a flea circus to a play about the plague
 "Bone Tomahawk" (2015) includes a discussion about flea circuses

Music 

 Taylor Street Flea Circus, indie rock band based in Portland, Oregon
 "Flea Circus", country song on the album Don’t You Go Chicken (1960s) by Ramblin' Tommy Scott
 "Flea Circus", grunge song on the album Step on a Bug (1988) by The U-Men
 "Flea Circus", modern creative song on the album Papa Woody (1996) by Ether Bunny
 "Flea Circus", anti-folk song on the album X-Ray Vision (1996) by The Moldy Peaches
 "Flea Circus", folk music song on the album Circle (2006) by Uiscedwr
 "Flea Circus", song by Marder in the film FAQ About Time Travel (2009)
 Neon Flea Circus, psyche-funk band based in Cork, Ireland, appeared in Solas Festival, June 2010.
 "Flea Circus", a jazz quartet led by trumpet player Jack Davies.
 "Fifi The Flea", pop/folk song on the album Would You Believe (1966) by The Hollies

Other 

 Master Flea, an 1822 novel by E. T. A. Hoffmann features a villain who uses his control over the titular character in order to create an elaborate flea circus.
 The Flea Circus (Novella, 1950s) by Billy Lee Brammer
 Esmeralda (1954), a short story by John Wyndham, is centered around a flea circus.
 'David Attenborogh's Natural Curiosities' 2015 features Svensons real flea circus.
 A flea circus is featured in Enid Blyton's novel The Mystery of the Missing Man (1956)
  McGruder's Marvels Galaxy Science Fiction, July 1968, by (R.A. Lafferty)
 The Flea Circus (Islet Books, 1989) by poet Alan Pizzarelli
 Mighty Morphin Power Rangers season one episode "For Whom the Bell Trolls" (1993), reveals Bulk and Skull's hobbies include picking up fleas from stray dogs. They attempted to demonstrate their flea circus in their class' hobby week, but the fleas escape onto their teacher Miss Appleby
 Round the Twist episode "Dog By Night" (2000), at a flea circus, a rare Transylvanian flea named Count Dracumite sinks its teeth into Pete, turning him into a werewolf at night
 Flea Circus, a bi-monthly event in Angel, London featuring comedy, music and poetry.
 Maxfield Rubbish and His Time Travelling Flea Circus, presented at the Hitchcock Puppet Theater in Balboa Park, San Diego, California
 "Flea Circus" (2006), Hewlett-Packard commercial produced by Bent Image Lab
 Touch Detective (2006), in episode 4 of this mystery adventure video game for the Nintendo DS, the main character, Penelope, claims that a murder happened at the flea circus.
 Flea Circus, a puzzle game on the FunOrb website, originally developed by Andrew Gower
 William Heaven's Bi-Weekly flea circus is held in both Cambridge and Newcastle upon Tyne 
 Flea circus and magic by Il Mago di Londra, magician Paul Saulsbury performed at the Ca'Bianca cabaret in Milan, Italy during the 1980s
 Acme Miniature Flea Circus was featured on the television show Jeopardy! in 2001.

References

Insects in popular culture